Fontwell Park Racecourse is a horse racing course located in the village of Fontwell in West Sussex, England, owned by ARC Racing. It features an oval hurdles course.

Fontwell Park was founded by Alfred Day who trained racehorses at The Hermitage, by the Chichester to Arundel road, from 1887. Day returned the name Fontwell to common use after researching the history of the area, and by 1924 he had purchased enough land to open the racecourse. The hurdles track was a normal shape, but the steeplechase course was laid out in a figure of eight shape to use the space on the site. The first meeting took place on 21 May 1924. The grandstand and the weighing room were built with thatched roofs. The opening race was won by Gem, the 5/4 favourite Gem, ridden by jockey Fred Rees.

At the course in October 1949, Princess Elizabeth (now Queen Elizabeth II) had her first winner as an owner when Monaveen won the Chichester Handicap Chase. In 1984, John Francome rode his 1,036th career winner at Fontwell Park, passing Stan Mellor's record for a National Hunt jockey - Francome's record has subsequently been beaten.

The feature race of the season at Fontwell Park is the Grade Two National Spirit Hurdle run over a distance of two miles and four furlongs in February. It is a recognised Cheltenham Festival trial. My Way de Solzen, trained by Alan King, won the race in 2006 before winning the World Hurdle. Lough Derg, trained by David Pipe and owned by Bill Frewen, took the prize in 2008 and 2009. Trenchant (Alan King/Robert Thornton) took the prize in 2010 and Celestial Halo (Paul Nicholls/Harry Skelton) was the winner in 2011.

A new £6.5m Grandstand opened in the Premier Enclosure in August 2010 sponsored by events and plant hire company Winner Group.

Notable races

References

External links 
 
Course guide on GG.COM
Course guide on At The Races
Official website History

 
Sports venues in West Sussex
Horse racing venues in England
Arun District
Sports venues completed in 1924